Richard Matthews may refer to:
Richard Matthews (soldier), general with the East India Company
Richard Matthews (microbiologist) (1921–1995), New Zealand plant virologist
Richard Matthews (cricketer) (born 1950), New Zealand cricketer
Richard Matthews (filmmaker) (1952–2013), South African wildlife filmmaker
Richard Matthews (Maryland), candidate for congress in Maryland

See also 

 Dick Matthews, American baseball player